Dolichomia craspedalis is a species of snout moth in the genus Hypsopygia. It was described by George Hampson in 1906 and is known from Brazil.

References

Moths described in 1906
Pyralini